Karnataka State Film Award for Best Supporting Actor is a state film award of the Indian state of Karnataka  given during the annual Karnataka State Film Awards. The award honours Kannada language films.

Superlative Winners

Award winners
The following is a partial list of award winners and the name of the films for which they won.

See also
 Cinema of Karnataka
 List of Kannada-language films

References

Karnataka State Film Awards
Kannada-language films